Wielątki Rosochate  is a Polish village in the Gmina Somianka administrative district. The district is found within Wyszków County, and the county is part of the Masovian Voivodeship found in east-central Poland.

References

Villages in Wyszków County